Chantal Škamlová (born 4 September 1993) is a Slovak tennis player.

Škamlová has won 12 singles titles and 40 doubles titles on the ITF Women's Circuit. In August 2017, she reached her best singles ranking of world No. 218. On 7 January 2019, she peaked at No. 116 in the WTA doubles rankings.

Škamlová won the girls' doubles event at the 2010 Australian Open, partnering with Jana Čepelová, defeating Tímea Babos and Gabriela Dabrowski in the final.

Junior career

Junior Grand Slam performance
Singles:
 Australian Open: 1R (2010)
 French Open: 3R (2010)
 Wimbledon: 1R (2009, 2010, 2011)
 US Open: 1R (2010)

Doubles:
 Australian Open: W (2010)
 French Open: QF (2011)
 Wimbledon: QF (2010)
 US Open: SF (2009)

ITF finals

Singles: 26 (12 titles, 14 runner–ups)

Doubles: 65 (40 titles, 25 runner–ups)

Junior Grand Slam finals

Girls' doubles: 1 (title)

References

External links

 
 
 
 
 

1993 births
Living people
Sportspeople from Banská Bystrica
Slovak female tennis players
Tennis players at the 2010 Summer Youth Olympics
Australian Open (tennis) junior champions
Grand Slam (tennis) champions in girls' doubles